Johannes Maximilian Kaiser Barents-Von Hohenhagen (born 5 January 1976) is a Chilean YouTuber and politician. He was a member of José Antonio Kast's Republican Party, from which he resigned after several of his misogynistic comments went viral.

Since 2017, he began to be known for his YouTube channel El Nacional-Libertario, a conservative-libertarian space where he openly supported Kast for his 2017 and 2021 presidential campaigns.

He defines himself as paleolibertarian, socially conservative, being against abortion; In addition, he claims to be a minarchist regarding the role of the State and a liberal in economic matters. He is in favor of the free carrying of weapons in Chile.

Biography

Early life and family
He was born in Santiago to Hans Kaiser and Rosmarie Barents-von Hohenhagen, third-generation German immigrants. He is the brother of Axel Kaiser, a Chilean libertarian ideologue, Vanessa Kaiser, a Chilean scholar and activist, and Leif Kaiser, leader of the Chilean rifle association.

He studied his early years at the German School in Santiago, Villarrica, and Temuco as he moved between those cities. He finished his last two years of high school at the Escuela Militar del Libertador Bernardo O'Higgins. In 1995 he enrolled in a law degree at the Finis Terrae University in Santiago, and then traveled to Germany to study at the University of Heidelberg.

References

External links
 El Nacional-Libertario at YouTube

1976 births
Living people
Members of the Chamber of Deputies of Chile
Finis Terrae University alumni
University of Innsbruck alumni
21st-century Chilean politicians
Republican Party (Chile, 2019) politicians
Chilean libertarians
People from Santiago
Chilean anti-communists
Chilean people of German descent